Maryna Hancharova (Łacinka: Maryna Siarhiejeŭna Hančarova; ; born 27 February 1990, Minsk) is a Belarusian rhythmic gymnast who competed in group events. She is the 2012 Olympic all-around silver medalist with group members Anastasiya Ivankova, Alina Tumilovich, Nataliya Leshchyk, Aliaksandra Narkevich, and Kseniya Sankovich. She is also the 2013 World group all-around champion and 2012 European champion in 3 ribbons/2 hoops.

Detailed Olympic results

References

External links 

 
 
 

Living people
Belarusian rhythmic gymnasts
Olympic gymnasts of Belarus
Olympic silver medalists for Belarus
Olympic medalists in gymnastics
Gymnasts at the 2012 Summer Olympics
1990 births
Medalists at the 2012 Summer Olympics
Medalists at the Rhythmic Gymnastics World Championships
Medalists at the Rhythmic Gymnastics European Championships
Gymnasts from Minsk